John Parsons was a British jockey and the youngest jockey ever to win The Derby, reportedly aged 16.

Parsons won the race on Caractacus, trained by Bob Smith. Caractacus was an unusual winner of the Derby. He had run and lost three times as a two-year-old, and as a three-year-old, he had been campaigned over races of two miles and more. He thus started the race at odds of 40/1 and was not expected to win. His owner Charles Snewing had interests in another more fancied runner, Spite, and Snewing's main jockey James Goater had been offered the ride on Caractacus, but had opted for Spite instead. This left Caractacus for Parsons, Snewing's stable boy, who had ridden the horse on three previous starts. Despite the low expectations, Caractacus won, Parsons riding the horse with "marvellous coolness and assurance". Parsons is reported to have encouraged his mount by shouting, "Get along, Crackey" and "Good lad, Crackey."

Subsequently, it is said that Parsons disappeared into "utter obscurity". Caractacus was his only ride in the Derby. He would later be found leading horses round the sales ring at Newmarket.

Major wins 
 Great Britain
Epsom Derby - Caractacus (1862)

References

Bibliography 
 

British jockeys
1840s births
Year of death unknown